The 2000 Paris–Roubaix was the 98th running of the Paris–Roubaix single-day cycling race, often known as the Hell of the North. These are the results for the 2000 edition of the Paris–Roubaix cycling classic, in which Johan Museeuw took his second Roubaix win. The year's race took place in warm and dry conditions but with strong winds.

Results
9-04-2000: Compiègne–Roubaix

References

2000
2000 in road cycling
2000 in French sport
Paris-Roubaix
April 2000 sports events in France